Dushan County is a county of 346,000 people (2007) in Guizhou province, China. It is under the administration of Qiannan Buyei and Miao Autonomous Prefecture, in the south of the province, bordering Guangxi to the south. The county seat is the town of Chengguan.

Dushan is located in a mountainous area, with elevations increasing from south to north. Transportation links include the Guizhou–Guangxi Railway, the G75 Lanzhou–Haikou Expressway, China National Highways 210 and 312. Important natural attractions are Duxiu Mountain, Shenxian Cave and Yuqing Caves, and Ziquan Lake.

History
From 2016 to 2020, the county government spent 40 billion renminbi ($5.7 billion U.S. dollars) on construction projects. Amanda Lee of the South China Morning Post described these as "white elephant". Guan Video created a 22 minute film titled How Dushan Burnt 40 Billion, released on  July 12, 2020. The copy on Sina Weibo had more than 27 million views by July 16.

Administrative divisions

There are 8 towns, 7 townships, and 3 ethnic townships:

Towns:
Chengguan, Shangsi, Mawei, Jiali, Xiasi, Jichang, Mawan, Yingshan Town 【previously Tuchang, Jiading Sui Ethnic Township and Wengtai Sui Ethnic Township】

Townships:
Yangfeng Township, Yaosuo Township, Shuiyan Township, Benzhai Sui Ethnic Township, Yaobang Township, Dongling Township, Huanghou Township, Dayang Township

Climate

References

External links
Official website of Dushan County government

 
County-level divisions of Guizhou
Qiannan Buyei and Miao Autonomous Prefecture